"Sometimes a Fantasy" is a song by Billy Joel released as the last single from his album Glass Houses. The single peaked at #36 on the US Billboard Hot 100.

The song is a "melodic, fast paced rocker."  It starts with Joel dialing a number on a telephone (which he is depicted doing on the single cover). The lyrics are about a sexually frustrated man who tries to convince his significant other to have phone sex. He explains that he is lonely since they are far away from each other (which is implied by the fact that his phone call is "long distance").

Music video
The video starts with Joel in bed, dialing a woman's number. She then picks up the phone and the music starts playing. While on the phone, Joel sings the song's lyrics to her throughout the video. Then, in the end, it turns out the entire call was just a fantasy, and no one picked up.

Other versions
The single version of "Sometimes a Fantasy" released in the United States and Canada has a running time of 4:19, making it longer than the album version, which runs at 3:40. The 45 RPM single also uses a different mix with guitars panned in different locations. The album's version ends with a fade out, while the single version does not, and instead includes Joel letting loose a Beatles' honoring yowl of "I got blisters on my blisters!", a reference to Ringo Starr's outburst, "I got blisters on my fingers" at the end of "Helter Skelter".

The extended version of the song was available as a US 7" vinyl, a Canadian 7" vinyl, a US promo 7" vinyl, a US DJ-promo 12" vinyl and (at 4:22) as the Japanese B-side of "All for Leyna" (available as a 7" and a 7" promo).
To date, the long version is not available on any of Joel's compilation albums, reissues, and is not available in CD or mp3 format.

The single was released in other countries as a 3:39 version, namely in Australia, the Netherlands and the UK (7" promo).

The official music video for this single uses an alternate vocal track, different from the album and single releases.

Reception
Billboard said that it "starts with a telephone ring and a rockabilly vocal before its transition into a melodic, fast-paced rocker." Record World called it a "pulsating rocker for AOR-pop."

Personnel 
 Billy Joel – vocals, Yamaha electric grand piano, synthesizers
 Richie Cannata – organ
 Dave Brown – electric guitar
 Russell Javors – electric guitar
 Doug Stegmeyer – bass
 Liberty DeVitto – drums, percussion

Chart history

References 

1979 songs
1980 singles
Billy Joel songs
American new wave songs
Columbia Records singles
Songs about telephone calls
Song recordings produced by Phil Ramone
Songs written by Billy Joel